Felicia Hwang Yi Xin popularly known as Felicia Hwang (born 18 April 1992) is an Indonesian model and beauty pageant titleholder who was crowned Puteri Indonesia Lingkungan 2016, She represented Indonesia at the Miss International 2016 pageant in Japan, where she finished as "2nd Runner-up" and won "Miss Best Dresser" award. Felicia repeating the same Indri Hapsari Suharto achievement precisely 39 years back in 1977 by finishing as the 2nd Runner-up in the respective Miss International beauty pageant. She is currently serving as the ambassador of the Indonesian National Narcotics Board.

Personal life

Felicia was born in Bandar Lampung, Indonesia, on 18 April 1992 to a Chinese-Indonesian family background. She attended SMA Negeri 2 Depok (primary-secondary) and holds a bachelor's degree on Business accounting and finance from Bradford University in Bradford, West Yorkshire, United Kingdom.

On 16 May 2016, Felicia was chosen as the Ambassador of the National Narcotics Board of Indonesia by the head of the agency, Budi Waseso. On 16 February 2019, she is married to Australian-Indonesian model and pastor, Garry Jordan. On 9 November 2019, she gave birth to her only son, Timothy Duncan Jordan.

Pageantry

Puteri Indonesia 2016
In 2016, Felicia competed in the national pageant of Puteri Indonesia 2016, representing the province of Lampung. She ended up winning the Puteri Indonesia Lingkungan 2016 title, at the grand finale held in Jakarta Convention Center, Jakarta, Indonesia on 19 February 2016. Felicia was crowned by the outgoing titleholder of Puteri Indonesia Lingkungan 2015 and Miss International Indonesia 2015, Chintya Fabyola of West Kalimantan at the end of the event.

She crowned together with Puteri Indonesia; Kezia Roslin Cikita Warouw of North Sulawesi, Puteri Indonesia Pariwisata; Intan Aletrinö of West Sumatra, and Puteri Indonesia Perdamaian; Ariska Pertiwi of North Sumatra.

Miss International 2016
As the winner of Puteri Indonesia Lingkungan 2016, Felicia representing Indonesia at the 56th edition of Miss International 2016 pageant. The Miss International 2016 finale was held on October 27, 2016 at the Tokyo Dome City Hall in Tokyo, Japan, where Felicia was won the 2nd Runner-up position. Felicia also managed to won "Miss Best Dresser" award, with Dewi Shinta inspired national costume dress. Edymar Martínez from Venezuela crowned her successor Kylie Verzosa from the Philippines by the end of the event.

Filmography
After returning to Indonesia, in 2019 Felicia received an offer to play in a film directed by Red Bull entitled "The Rebels", Felicia started acting with a number of famous actors and actresses such as Luna Maya, Atta Halilintar, and Valerie Thomas. Since then, Felicia has appeared on several movies. She has acted in several television film and cinema box-office movies.

Movies

See also

 Puteri Indonesia 2016
 Miss International 2016
 Kezia Roslin Cikita Warouw
 Intan Aletrinö
 Ariska Putri Pertiwi

References

External links
 
 Puteri Indonesia Official Website
 Miss International Official Website
 

Living people
1992 births
Alumni of the University of Bradford
Puteri Indonesia contestants
Puteri Indonesia winners
Miss International 2016 delegates
Indonesian beauty pageant winners
Indonesian female models
Indonesian activists
Indonesian people of Chinese descent
People from Bandar Lampung
People from Lampung